The Battle of Laswari took place on 1 November 1803 near Laswari village, Alwar. It was part of the Second Anglo-Maratha War.

The British under Gerard Lake were anxious to finish the war by neutralizing the last substantial force that the Maratha confederacy possessed, consisting of twelve battalions of regular infantry trained by the adventurer Chevalier Dudrenec. Dudrenec deserted the Marathas and command fell onto Ambaji Ingle, a veteran Maratha officer.

Lake decided to dispense first with his artillery and later with his infantry in a series of forced marches to catch up with the Maratha force. Lake initially encountered the enemy force with just three brigades of cavalry, but the British troopers by repeated charges were able to contain the Maratha army until the British infantry arrived.

The British units, commanded by Lake, were about 10,000 men strong, opposing Sindhia's force of 9,000 veteran infantry and 5,000 cavalry under the command of Ambaji Ingle. The British units were also supported by additional allied troops from Alwar.

The Maratha infantry made a most gallant defence, standing their ground until the survivors laid down their arms. The cavalry also suffered heavily. The British captured 72 guns and a large quantity of ammunition and stores. Lake later wrote, "I never was in so severe a business in my life or anything like it… these fellows fought like devils, or rather like heroes".

"The casualties on both sides were very heavy. The Company lost many officers, including Maj. Gen. Weir, Col. Vandeleur and Maj. Griffith. Lakes's son was also killed."

On 17 December 1803, Raghuji Bhonsale (II) of Nagpur signed the Treaty of Deogaon with the British after the Battle of Laswari and gave up the province of Cuttack including Balasore.

In this battle, the people of the Meena tribe of Shahjahanpur fought a lot and drove the British away.

Events of the Battle 
After storming Aligarh on 4 September 1803, General Lake advanced to Delhi where the Marathas under Perron and Bourquien were again defeated. At the end of September, Lake left Delhi and marched on to Agra. He took the fort at Agra by storm. However, there still remained fifteen regular battalions, which Sindhia had sent from the Deccan under the command of Chevalier Dudrenec and though the latter surrendered himself to the British force at Mathura, his battalions remained intact and were, indeed, augmented by two others, which had escaped from Delhi. This powerful force made no attempt to prevent the capture of Agra by Lord Lake, its object being to recover Delhi, the recapture of which was regarded by Sindhia as the first importance to his prestige.

General Lake marched westward from Agra on 27 October 1803, against this force, which was known to be near Kathumar, a place 27 miles (about 43 km) north-west of Bharatpur. When he reached here on 31 October in the evening, he learnt that the enemy had left the place that very morning and retreated northwards. Lake was joined on 29 October by Ahmad Bakhsh Khan, the Vakil of the Alwar ruler, with a body of troops and contingent of Meos, who gave useful help in providing supplies and furnishing information about the movement of the Marathas.

The Marathas after bombarding Kathumar in the afternoon of 29 October, stayed there till they heard of the advance of Lake. A well manoeuvred attack coupled with Lake's presence of mind and his son's extraordinary gallantry, brought the Marathas on the brink of complete annihilation. The casualty on the side of the vanquished was heavy-700 men killed and 2,000 prisoners. The British losses were about 800 casualties.

References

Laswari
Laswari 1803
Laswari 1803
1803 in India
Laswari 1803
November 1803 events